is a Japanese professional footballer who plays as a midfielder for Mito HollyHock.

References

External links

1995 births
Living people
Japanese footballers
Association football midfielders
V-Varen Nagasaki players
J1 League players
J2 League players